Inter National Bank was a $1.8 billion U.S. bank headquartered in McAllen, Texas.  With 21 Texas locations, Inter National Bank offered a full range of banking products for businesses and consumers in the Rio Grande Valley, El Paso and Laredo.  It was included in the list of the top 30 largest banks by asset size headquartered in Texas.

Inter National Bank had a Five Star Safe & Sound rating by Bankrate, its highest rating.  Inter National Bank maintained a Bankrate Safe & Sound five star rating from September 2013 to December 2015.  Inter National Bank was also rated Five-Star Superior for financial strength by BauerFinancial and was included in the Bauer's Recommended Bank Report.

On November 27, 2018, Inter National Bank and Vantage Bank Texas merged. The consolidated bank now operates under the Vantage Bank Texas name.

History
In 1991, Hidalgo Federal Savings & Loan Association in Edinburg, Texas failed and a portion of its assets were acquired by Inter National Bank.

In 2002, the American Bankers Association's ABA Banking Journal named Inter National Bank the top performing non-Subchapter S bank in the nation with assets between $100 million and $1 billion.

In 2005, Inter National Bank acquired Weslaco-based City National Bank.

In 2006, Mexico's Banorte acquired 70% of INB Financial Corp stock for $259 million. INB Financial Corp is the holding company of Inter National Bank. Banorte exercised its option to acquire the remaining 30% of INB Financial Corp stock for $146.6 million in 2009.

On November 3, 2016, it was announced that the Collins Family Trust was acquiring Inter National Bank from Banorte.  Terms of the deal were not disclosed.  James W. Collins, trustee of the Collins Family Trust, is one of the original founders of the bank and was the majority shareholder prior to the Banorte acquisition.

On March 31, 2017 the Collins Family completed the purchase of Inter National Bank and named James W. Collins, Chairman of the Board.

On November 27, 2018, Inter National Bank and Vantage Bank Texas merged. The consolidation, which will operate under Vantage Bank Texas, created a community bank with $1.9 billion in total assets. Vantage Bank Texas was founded in 1923 and is a family-owned, community-based financial institution headquartered in San Antonio, Texas.

References

Banks based in Texas
Defunct banks of the United States
Companies based in McAllen